List of automatic, dual clutch automatic, and manual transmissions and transaxles used in vehicles manufactured by Ford Motor Company.

Automatic 
 1950–1965 Ford-O-Matic
 1958–1979 Cruise-O-Matic
 MX/FX
 1968–1981 FMX—A hybrid of the FX and MX
 1964–1981 C4
 Most small block V8 powered cars of the 1960s and 1970s in the North American market
 1966–1996 C6
 Most big-block V8 powered cars/trucks of the 1960s and 1970s in the North American market, All Fseries trucks without O/D, 80 thru 96 (97 For F250HD, F350, and F-Superduty models)
 1974–1989 C3—Light-duty, smaller than the C4
 1982–1986 C5—Improved C4, with a lock-up converter
 1985–1994 A4LD—C3 with overdrive
 1989–1996 E4OD—C6 with overdrive
 1998–2004 4R100—Replaces the E4OD transmission
 1995–2001 4R44E—Electronically controlled A4LD, light-duty
 1995–1997 4R55E—Electronically controlled A4LD, heavy-duty
 1997–Current 5R44/5R55 Series—5-speed 5R44E/5R55E/N/S/W based on the 4R44E/4R55E, Bordeaux Automatic Transmission Plant /  Sharonville Ohio transmission plant
 Lincoln LS and Ford Thunderbird
 Ford Falcon (Australia)
 2005–2010 Ford Mustang V6, GT
 1980–1993 AOD—Ford's first 4-speed automatic transmission, based on the FMX but with a torque-splitting feature.
 1992–   AOD-E—Electronic AOD
 1993–2008   4R70W—Strengthened AOD-E with lower 1st and 2nd gear ratios
Application vary by year
 Ford F-Series
 Ford Crown Victoria
 Mercury Grand Marquis
 Lincoln Town Car
 Ford Mustang
 Ford Expedition
 Ford E-Series
 2003–2008   4R75E & 4R75W
Applications vary by year
4.2L, 4.6L, & 5.4L (2v & 3v)
F150
Ford E-Series Van
Ford Expedition
Ford Panther platform
Ford Crown Victoria
Mercury Grand Marquis
Lincoln Town Car
Ford Mustang (GT and Mach 1)
Mercury Marauder
 Ford Police Interceptor
 AXOD family—Van Dyke Transmission
 1986–1991 AXOD—4-speed transaxle
 Ford Taurus, Lincoln Continental, Mercury Sable
 1991–1993 AXOD-E—4-speed electronic transaxle
 Ford Taurus, Lincoln Continental, Mercury Sable
 1994–2003 AX4S—4-speed electronic transaxle
 Ford Taurus, Ford Windstar, Lincoln Continental, Mercury Sable
 1995–2007 AX4N/4F50N—4-speed electronic transaxle
 Ford Freestar, Ford Taurus, Ford Windstar, Lincoln Continental, Mercury Monterey, Mercury Sable
 1980–1994 FLC—3-speed hydraulic transaxle
 Ford Escort, Ford Tempo, Mercury Topaz, Ford Taurus, Mercury Sable, and Ford EXP
 1989–1997 4EAT-G—4-speed Mazda design transaxle
 Ford Probe
 1990–2003 F-4EAT—4-speed electronic transaxle—Mazda transaxle 
 Ford Escort, Mercury Tracer
 2000-2013 4F27E—Strengthened 4-speed F-4EAT
 Ford Focus, Ford Transit Connect
 1994–2007 CD4E—4-speed transaxle, Batavia Transmission—Replaces the 4EAT-G transaxle
 Ford Contour, Ford Escape, Ford Mondeo, Ford Probe, Mercury Cougar, Mercury Mariner, Mercury Mystique, Mazda Tribute, Mazda 626.
 2003.5–2010 5R110W – 5-speed automatic with Tow/Haul mode – Replaces 4R100 in Super Duty trucks
 Ford Super Duty
 2011–2019 6R140 - 6-speed automatic with Tow/Haul mode - Replaces 5R110W in Super Duty trucks.
 Ford Super Duty
2020–present 10R140 - 10-speed automatic with Tow/Haul Mode - Replaces the 6R140 in Super Duty trucks.  
 Ford Super Duty
 2005–present Aisin AWF-21 6-speed
 Lincoln MKZ (2006-2010), Ford Fusion AWD (2007-2009), Land Rover LR2
 2005–2007 ZF-Batavia CFT30—Continuously variable transaxle (CVT)
 Ford Freestyle, Ford Five Hundred, Mercury Montego
 2005–2016 6R60 ZF 6-speed transmission
 Ford Falcon (BF, FG)
 Ford Territory (AWD)
 2006-2009 Ford FNR5 transmission - A 5 speed automatic from Mazda, uses Ford FNR5 fluid
 Ford Fusion, Mercury Milan
 2006–2007 6R60 6-speed transmission
 Ford Explorer, Mercury Mountaineer
 2007–present 6R80 6-speed transmission
 Ford Expedition, Lincoln Navigator, Ford F-Series, 2011 Ford Mustang (V6 & GT), 2011 Ford Territory, 2011 Ford Ranger (Note: Global excluding USA)
 2007–present 6F50—6-speed transaxle, Van Dyke Transmission
 Ford Edge, Ford Explorer, Lincoln MKX, Lincoln MKS, Ford Taurus, Ford Flex, Lincoln MKT, Lincoln MKZ (2010–Present)
 2009–present 6F35—6-speed transaxle, Van Dyke Transmission
 Ford Escape, Ford Fusion, Ford Focus, Ford C-Max, Ford Kuga (in the Focus, C-Max and Kuga it is used with the 1.5 L4 Ecoboost. Also used with the ford escape in 2.0 L4 GTDI variant, and rated for vehicles up to 3.0L)
 2009–present 6F55—6-speed transaxle (designed for use with the 3.5L Ecoboost V6)
 Lincoln MKS, Ford Flex, Ford Taurus SHO, Lincoln MKT, Ford Explorer Sport (2013–present)
 2013–present HF35 Hybrid and Plug in Hybrid transaxle.
 Ford Fusion HEV, Ford Fusion Energi PHEV, Ford C-Max HEV, Ford C-Max Energi PHEV, Lincoln MKZ Hybrid.
 2017–present 10R80 Ford-GM 10-speed automatic transmission
 2017 Ford F-150 (including Ford Raptor), Ford Expedition, Ford Mustang
 2017–present 6F15—6-speed transaxle (designed for use with the 1.0 EcoBoost to replace the DPS6 Powershift transmission)
 Ford EcoSport, Ford Focus, Ford C-Max
 2017–present 8F35 8-speed transverse transmission (1.5 EcoBlue, 2.0 Duratorq, 2.0 EcoBoost)
 Ford Edge, Ford Escape (2020), Ford Focus, Ford Maverick (2.0 EcoBoost), Ford S-MAX, Ford Taurus
 2017–present 8F40 8-speed transverse transmission (2.0 EcoBlue)
 Ford Edge, Ford Focus, Ford S-MAX, Ford Galaxy, Ford Mondeo, Ford Kuga
 2018–present 8F24 8-speed transverse transmission (1.0 and 1.5 EcoBoost)
 Ford Focus
 2018–present 8F57 8-speed transverse transmission for higher torque (2.7 V6 EcoBoost)
 Ford Edge ST, Ford Explorer, Ford Fusion, Ford Taurus
 2020–present 8F SelectShift® 8-speed transverse transmission (2.0 and 2.3 EcoBoost)
 Lincoln Corsair,
 Lincoln Zephyr (China)
 2021–present HF45 Hybrid and Plug in Hybrid transaxle.
 Ford Escape/Kuga FHEV / PHEV, Ford Maverick HEV.

Dual-clutch automatics 
These are dual-clutch transmissions.

 2008–present 6DCT150 Ford Powershift 6-speed wet clutch
 Ford Fiesta
 2008–present 6DCT250 Ford Powershift (DPS6) 6-speed dry clutch
 Ford EcoSport, Ford Fiesta, Ford Focus.
 The 2012-2016 DPS6 Powershift transmission was used in the 2012-2016 Ford Focus and 2011-2016 Ford Fiesta sedans. This transmission is the subject of a massive number of lawsuits alleging Ford lied in order to sell cars Ford knew had defective transmissions.
 2008–present 6DCT450 Ford Powershift (MPS6) 6-speed wet clutch
 Ford Focus, Ford Mondeo, Ford Kuga, Ford Galaxy, Ford Fiesta, Ford C-Max, Ford S-Max
 Getrag Transmissions 
 2020 7DCT300
 Ford Puma 
 Ford Fiesta
 2017–present 7DCL750 Getrag - 7-speed
 Ford GT (2nd gen. V6)
 Tremec Transmissions
 2020–present Tremec TR-9070 7-speed
 Shelby GT500

Manual 
 1960-1967 Ford/Mercury HED 3-speed transmission (non-syncro first gear)
 1968- Ford Type E (aka Built or 2000e) 4-speed transmission  Came in Anglia 105E, Cortina MkI, Lotus Cortina MkI, Cortina MkII to up to '68, Consul Classic, Consul Capri, Corsair, Escort TC, Mexico Mk1 and RS1600 MkI. 
 1976–1985 BC or BC4
 1982–1995 BC5
 1995–present IB5
 MT75
 Ford Sierra, Ford Granada, Ford Escort Cosworth, Ford Scorpio, Ford Transit
 1981–1994 MTX-III
 1989–1995 MTX-IV
 MTX-75, "Cologne" transmission
 Ford Contour, Ford Escort, Ford Focus, Ford Mondeo, Jaguar X-Type, Mercury Cougar
 Toploader
 RUG SROD (Single Rail Over drive) 3-Speed+OD 83-86 F-150  78-84 Fairmont/Granada (SBF only)
 Type 9 (or Type N, T-9)
 Ford Capri 1.6, 2.0 1983 onwards, Capri 2.8 1982 onwards, Ford Sierra 1.6, 1.8, 2.0, Sierra XR4i, Sierra XR4x4 2.8, Merkur XR4Ti
 New Process 435  heavy duty 4 speed  transmission  
 Clark / Tremec  4 speed OD  and SROD  
 Tremec or Borg-Warner transmissions
 Borg-Warner T-18/T-19 transmissions - circa 1966-1991 Ford F-Series
 Borg-Warner T-10 transmission – 1957–1965
 Borg-Warner T-5 transmission – Ford Sierra; 1983–1995 Ford Mustang; 2005–2009 Mustang V6
Tremec T-170/T-175/T176/T177 1984-1990+?  F-series 
 Tremec T-45 transmission – 1996–1999 Mustang Cobra, 1996–2000 Mustang GT
 Tremec T-56 transmission – 2000 Cobra R and 2003–2004 Mustang Cobra, Ford Falcon (BF) I6T and 5.4l V8 BF MK1 - BF MK11
 Tremec TR-3650 transmission – 2001–2010 Mustang GT; 2003-2004 Mustang Mach 1
 Tremec TR-6060 transmission – 2007–present Ford Shelby GT500, Ford Falcon (FG) I6T, 5.4L and 5.0L supercharged V8
 Getrag transmissions
 Getrag MT-285 6-Speed Manual - 2002-2004 Focus SVT
Getrag MT-82 - 2011–present Mustang GT
Getrag MMT6 - 2013-2018 Focus ST, 2003-2012 Focus ST220 (non-US), 2017-2018 Focus RS, Volvo C30, C70, S40, S60, S80, V50, V60, V70, Ford  Transit (front-wheel drive, non-US), Ford Mondeo, Ford S-Max
Getrag iB6 - Ford Fiesta, Ford Fusion with 1.6L EcoBoost, Ford Focus with 1.0L EcoBoost, and numerous non-US market models including S-Max, Mondeo, Focus ST (petrol and diesel),
 Mazda M5OD transmissions
 M5OD-R1 – Ford Ranger, Bronco II, Explorer, Aerostar.
 M5OD-R1HD – Ford Ranger (4.0L V6 only)
 M5OD-R2 – Thunderbird Super Coupe, Ford F-150, Bronco (except with  V8)
 Toyo Kogyo (Early Mazda)
 TK 4 4 speed manual (No Overdrive) (Ranger, Bronco II 83-85, Aerostar 85) 
 TK 5 5 speed manual (With overdrive) (Ranger, Bronco II 85-87, Aerostar 85-87)

 Mitsubishi FM145/FM146 5 speed (overdrive) (Ranger/Bronco II 86-92 with 2.0L, 2.3L, and 2.9L engines only)

 ZF Transmissions
 S5-42- Late 80’s and early 90’s F-250+
 S5-47- Mid 90’s to 2000 F-250+
 ZF 5 DS-25-2- Pantera, GT40
 S6-650- 2000-2003 F250+
 S6-750-  2003-2006 F250+

References

See also 
 List of Ford bellhousing patterns

Ford transmissions